Ilie Năstase defeated Björn Borg in the final, 6–2, 6–2, 6–1 to win the singles title at the 1975 Commercial Union Assurance Masters.

Guillermo Vilas was the defending champion, but lost to Năstase in the semifinals in a rematch of the previous year's final.

Draw

Finals

Blue group
 Standings are determined by: 1. number of wins; 2. number of matches; 3. in two-players-ties, head-to-head records; 4. in three-players-ties, percentage of sets won, or of games won; 5. steering-committee decision.

White group
 Standings are determined by: 1. number of wins; 2. number of matches; 3. in two-players-ties, head-to-head records; 4. in three-players-ties, percentage of sets won, or of games won; 5. steering-committee decision.

See also
ATP World Tour Finals appearances

References
1975 Masters-Singles

1975 Commercial Union Assurance Masters